= 16 Songs =

16 Songs may refer to:

- Fryderyk Chopin: 16 Songs Op. 74
- Kodály: 16 Songs Op.1
